Priscilla Hon and Vera Lapko were the defending champions, but both players chose not to participate.

Hayley Carter and Ena Shibahara won the title, defeating Sanaz Marand and Victoria Rodríguez in the final, 6–3, 6–1.

Seeds

Draw

Draw

References
Main Draw

Kentucky Bank Tennis Championships - Doubles
Lexington Challenger